Keenan Rashaun Howry (born June 17, 1981) is a former American football wide receiver and return specialist. He attended the University of Oregon as a wide receiver (WR). Howry played in the NFL for three years, with the Minnesota Vikings.

1981 births
Living people
Players of American football from Los Angeles
American football wide receivers
Howry Keenan
Minnesota Vikings players
Canadian football wide receivers
Hamilton Tiger-Cats players
Players of Canadian football from Los Angeles